Dunfermline Queen Margaret railway station is a railway station in the city of Dunfermline, Fife, Scotland. The station takes its name from the nearby Queen Margaret Hospital. It is the longest railway station name in Scotland.

History 
The station was opened on 26 January 2000 by Railtrack and the former National Express franchisee, ScotRail. It is located at the east side of the former triangular junction formed by Touch North, Touch South and Townhill Junctions (where the now closed Stirling and Dunfermline Railway to Stirling via Alloa diverged), and serves the eastern side of Dunfermline. Passengers can only purchase tickets using a machine at the station. There is no ticket office or newsagents and only a small covered waiting area, although there is a fairly large car park with 93 spaces and two electric vehicle charging points.

Services 
An hourly service operates in the evening (to Glenrothes only) and on Sundays (full circular service northbound).

References

Bibliography 

 
 RAILSCOT on Dunfermline Branch of Edinburgh and Northern Railway

Railway stations in Dunfermline
Railway stations opened by Railtrack
Railway stations in Great Britain opened in 2000
Railway stations served by ScotRail
2000 establishments in Scotland